Ignacio Yáñez Cidad (born April 11, 1973 in Madrid) is a retired Spanish professional basketball player and a current manager.

In April 2012, after becoming champion of LEB Oro and Copa Príncipe de Asturias with Iberostar Canarias, he decided to retire of professional basketball.

Honours
Canarias
Copa Príncipe MVP: 1
2012

Spain

Mediterranean Games Gold Medal: 1
2001

References

External links
Player profile at ACB.com
Coach profile at ACB.com
Profile at FEB.es

1973 births
Living people
Baloncesto Fuenlabrada players
Baloncesto León players
CB Canarias players
CB Estudiantes players
Liga ACB players
Menorca Bàsquet players
Spanish basketball coaches
Spanish men's basketball players
Basketball players from Madrid
CB Inca players
UB La Palma players
Tenerife CB players
Mediterranean Games gold medalists for Spain
Mediterranean Games medalists in basketball
Competitors at the 2001 Mediterranean Games
Forwards (basketball)
Real Canoe NC basketball players